Sidi Bou Said is a town in northern Tunisia located about 20 km from the capital, Tunis.

Named for a religious figure who lived there, Abu Said al-Baji, it was previously  called Jabal el-Menar. The town itself is a tourist attraction and is known for its extensive use of blue and white. It can be reached by a TGM train, which runs from Tunis to La Marsa.

History 
In the 12th century/13th century AD Abu Said Ibn Khalaf Yahya al-Tamimi al-Beji arrived in  the village of Jabal el-Menar and established a sanctuary. After his death in 1231, he was buried there. In the  18th century wealthy citizens of Tunis built residences in Sidi Bou Said.

During the 1920s, Rodolphe d'Erlanger introduced the blue-white theme to the town. His home, Ennejma Ezzahra, is now a museum that has a collection of musical instruments, and organizes concerts of classical and Arabic music.

Famous people 
Sidi Bou Said has a reputation as a town of artists. Artists who have lived in or visited Sidi Bou Said include famous occultist Aleister Crowley, Paul Klee, Gustave-Henri Jossot, August Macke and Louis Moillet. Tunisian artists in Sidi Bou Said are members of École de Tunis (painting school of Tunis), such as Yahia Turki, Brahim Dhahak and Ammar Farhat. French philosopher Michel Foucault lived there for a number of years while teaching at the University of Tunis. French author Andre Gide also had a house in the town.

Former Tunisian President Beji Caid Essebsi was born in Sidi Bou Said, as was Moufida Tlatli, film director, screenwriter, and editor.

Azzedine Alaïa had a house in Sidi Bou Said which is now transformed into an art gallery.

French singer Patrick Bruel sang about Sidi Bou Said, specifically about Café des Délices, in his song Au Café des Délices in his 1999 album Juste Avant.

Gallery

References

External links 

About Sidi Bou Said in general
Lexicorient

Populated places in Tunis Governorate
Communes of Tunisia